Winogradskyella damuponensis is a Gram-negative, strictly aerobic, rod-shaped and motile bacterium from the genus of Winogradskyella which has been isolated from seawater from the beach of Damupo in Korea.

References

Flavobacteria
Bacteria described in 2013